Clemson University, founded in 1889, is a public research university located in Clemson, South Carolina. The university is led by a president, who is selected by the board of trustees. The president acts as the school's chief executive officer, reporting to the board, and is tasked with providing leadership to the faculty and students, and represents the institution in public.

The institution's first president was Henry Aubrey Strode, appointed in 1890, and its 15th and current is James P. Clements, who assumed office in 2013. All of Clemson's presidents have been white men.  Robert Cook Edwards had the longest tenure at 21 years, and Walter T. Cox Jr. had the shortest at eight months. There have been two interim presidents, and five presidents who have been alumni of the university.  , the salary of the president was $987,530.

The first official residence for the president was completed in 1893, with president Craighead as its first resident.  Walter Riggs, already a professor at the university, chose to remain in his house upon becoming president.  Following his death, presidents Sikes and Poole also lived in the Riggs house.  The current president's house was completed in 1959 for R. C. Edwards. The office of the president is housed in Sikes Hall.

Presidents

Timeline of presidencies

Notes

References

Citations

Works cited

External links
 Official website

 
Clemson